Phlocteis is a genus of beetles in the family Buprestidae, containing the following species:

 Phlocteis cyaniventris Kerremans, 1898
 Phlocteis exasperata (Swartz, 1817)
 Phlocteis hova Thery, 1937
 Phlocteis humeralis (Waterhouse, 1887)
 Phlocteis quadricornis (Fairmaire, 1892)

References

Buprestidae genera